David Dixon (born 27 March 1977) is an English professional golfer.

Career
Dixon was born in Bridgwater, Somerset, England. He turned professional in 2001.

Dixon had a glittering amateur career, the highlight of which was his performance at the 2001 Open Championship, where he earned the silver medal as the lowest finishing amateur.

Dixon bounced between the European Tour and the Challenge Tour between 2001 and 2007. However, in 2008 he secured his first ever professional win, and his status as a European Tour member, with victory at the Saint-Omer Open. He was never able to follow up his win and in 2019, he won the Matchroom Sport Championship on the PGA EuroPro Tour.

Amateur wins
2000 Lytham Trophy
2001 South African Amateur Championship

Professional wins (11)

European Tour wins (1)

1Dual-ranking event with the Challenge Tour

Challenge Tour wins (1)

1Dual-ranking event with the European Tour

PGA EuroPro Tour wins (1)

Jamega Pro Golf Tour wins (8)

Source:

Other wins (1)
2018 PGA Play-offs

Results in major championships

Note: Dixon only played in The Open Championship.
LA = Low Amateur
"T" = tied

European Tour career summary

Team appearances
PGA Cup (representing Great Britain and Ireland): 2015 (winners), 2019

See also
2005 European Tour Qualifying School graduates
2007 European Tour Qualifying School graduates
2011 European Tour Qualifying School graduates
2015 European Tour Qualifying School graduates

References

External links

English male golfers
European Tour golfers
People from Bridgwater
1977 births
Living people